Urbanity is an album by American jazz pianist Hank Jones featuring solo piano recordings from 1947 and 1953 which was released on the Clef label.

Reception

Allmusic awarded the album 3 stars stating, "Particularly on the unaccompanied solos, Hank Jones shows off the influence of Art Tatum, while the trio cuts are more boppish and sometimes recall the King Cole Trio. Excellent music".

Track listing
All compositions by Hank Jones except as indicated
 "Thad's Pad" - 2:56
 "Things Are So Pretty in the Spring" (Hank Jones, Helen Jones) - 3:38
 "Little Girl Blue" (Richard Rodgers, Lorenz Hart) - 2:45
 "Odd Number" - 3:30
 "Blues for Lady Day" - 2:41
 "The Night We Called It a Day" (Matt Dennis, Tom Adair) - 3:20
 "Yesterdays" (Jerome Kern, Otto Harbach) - 3:03
 "You're Blasé" (Ord Hamilton, Bruce Sievier) - 3:06
 "Tea for Two" (Vincent Youmans, Irving Caesar) - 3:00
 "The Blue Room" (Rodgers, Hart) - 2:42
 "Thad's Pad" [Alternative Take] - 3:00 Bonus track on CD reissue
 "Thad's Pad" [False Start and Incomplete Take] - 0:31 Bonus track on CD reissue
 "Thad's Pad" [Alternative Take] - 2:58 Bonus track on CD reissue
 "Things Are So Pretty in the Spring" [Alternative Take] (Jones, Jones) - 4:13 Bonus track on CD reissue
 "Things Are So Pretty in the Spring" [Breakdown Takes 3-6] (Jones, Jones) - 3:19 Bonus track on CD reissue
 "Things Are So Pretty in the Spring" [Alternative Take] (Jones, Jones) - 3:36 Bonus track on CD reissue
 "Things Are So Pretty in the Spring" [Alternative Take] (Jones, Jones) - 3:39 Bonus track on CD reissue

Personnel 
Hank Jones - piano
Johnny Smith - guitar (tracks 1-4 & 11-17)
Ray Brown - bass (tracks 1-4 & 11-17)

Album design 
LP cover illustration by David Stone Martin

References 

1956 albums
Hank Jones albums
Clef Records albums
Albums produced by Norman Granz